Iryna Kovalenko (born 12 June 1986) is a Ukrainian female high jumper, who won an individual gold medal at the Youth World Championships.

References

External links

1986 births
Living people
People from Bila Tserkva
Ukrainian female high jumpers
Universiade silver medalists for Ukraine
Universiade medalists in athletics (track and field)
Medalists at the 2005 Summer Universiade
21st-century Ukrainian women